Matiltan is a valley in Pakistan about 11 km away from Kalam. It has large glaciers, thick forests and lofty mountain peaks. The tallest peak of Falak Sar mountain can be seen from it. It is accessible through a non metalled road from Kalam by a four-wheel drive vehicle and the charming lake of Mahodand comes after this village of Kalam.

See also
Usho
Utror
Gabral
Mahodand

References 

Swat Kohistan
Hill stations in Pakistan
Tourist attractions in Swat